Endotricha chionocosma is a species of snout moth in the genus Endotricha. It is found in Australia.

References

Moths described in 1904
Endotrichini